The 2006 NCAA Division I Men's Swimming and Diving Championships were contested in March 2006 at the Georgia Tech Aquatic Center at the Georgia Institute of Technology in Atlanta, Georgia at the 83rd annual NCAA-sanctioned swim meet to determine the team and individual national champions of Division I men's collegiate swimming and diving in the United States.

Auburn once again topped the team standings, finishing 36 points ahead of Arizona. It was the Tigers' fourth consecutive and sixth overall men's team title.

Team standings
Note: Top 10 only
(H) = Hosts
(DC) = Defending champions
Full results

See also
List of college swimming and diving teams

References

NCAA Division I Men's Swimming and Diving Championships
NCAA Division I Swimming And Diving Championships
NCAA Division I Men's Swimming And Diving Championships
NCAA Division I Men's Swimming and Diving Championships